Philipp Offenthaler (born 03 March 1997) is an Austrian professional footballer who plays as a midfielder for Austrian Football Second League club SKU Amstetten.

Career

Early career
Offenthaler began his career at TSV Grein in Austria, joining AKA St. Pölten from 2011 to 2012, before returning to Grein. Later in 2012 he moved to SG Waidhofen.

SCU Ardagger
At the start of the 2014–15 he moved to SCU Ardagger, debuting in April 2015; while at SCU Ardagger he was nominated and then named the 2016 Austrian amateur player of the year.

SV Wacker Burghausen
For the 2016–17 season, Offenthaler moved to SV Wacker Burghausen who play in the Regionalliga Bayern in Germany; he made his debut playing against TSV 1860 Munich II.

SKN St. Pölten II
He returned to Austria for 2017–18, playing for SKN St. Pölten II.

SKU Amstetten
In the 2018–19 season he joined SKU Amstetten where his coach in an interview stated that Offenthaler only lived fifteen kilometres from the club, which mostly featured local players. During his first season, he played seven times for the club at league, with his first start on 5 August 2018, against FC Wacker Innsbruck.

On 26 October 2020, Offenthaler scored his first goal for the club in a 3–3 draw against FC Juniors OÖ after an assist by Daniel Scharner.

References

External links 

Living people
1997 births
Austrian footballers
2. Liga (Austria) players
SKU Amstetten players
Association football midfielders
People from Amstetten, Lower Austria
SV Wacker Burghausen players
Regionalliga players
SKN St. Pölten players
Austrian expatriate footballers
Expatriate footballers in Germany
Austrian expatriate sportspeople in Germany
Footballers from Lower Austria